Karen Harrison (16 November 1960 – May 2011) was the first woman in Britain to be appointed as a train driver, during which time she was an active trade unionist and political campaigner.

Early years 

Karen Harrison, the daughter of a customs officer, was born in Glasgow and raised in London, attending St. Michael's Convent Grammar School, Finchley. She left school at 16, working at London's Marquee Club during the heyday of punk rock before applying to British Rail in 1977 with the aim of starting an apprenticeship as a 'Secondman' which, at the time, was the first step to becoming a train driver.

Harrison's struggle to become a train driver began immediately when she appeared for her interview with the British Rail recruitment officers, who had assumed their latest applicant would be male. Upon meeting Harrison and discovering her sex, they endeavoured to push her away from a career on the locomotive footplate and towards secretarial duties. However, she refused to be put off and insisted she wanted to become a train driver.

Railway and trade union career
Starting at Old Oak Common depot (now owned by Great Western Railway and subsequently relocated at London Paddington station), she transferred to Marylebone depot (now part of Chiltern Railways) after 10 years. There was much resistance to her presence on the footplate from both managers and colleagues, who vehemently disapproved of the presence of a woman in their masculine world. Ten years of sustained harassment – both verbal and physical – abated after her transfer to Marylebone depot.

Harrison has described her railway career as "Ten years of hell, ten years of heaven. It's a bit tough when you're only a teenager and you're hit by this gigantic tidal wave of hate. To a lot of the men, I was the proverbial turd in the swimming pool. Every day I walked into the mess room I'd be s***ting myself, but strutting about pretending not to be. I couldn't let them create no-go areas for me; that would've established a precedent and we couldn't have that, could we? It would've been the beginning of the end." In the BBC documentary, People's Century, she put her survival over that first decade down to "Glaswegian family genes, rich in stubbornness" and the support of the old-style Communists at the depot: "It was like being raised by wolves. They did a grand job, bless them."

After moving to Marylebone depot she rapidly advanced through the ranks of her trade union, having joined the train drivers' union, ASLEF, on her first day on the railway. Harrison became the first woman to hold various positions in ASLEF, culminating in 1995 when she was elected to the highest position a lay member can hold: presiding over ASLEF's annual conference (The Annual Assembly of Delegates) during which time she was an active trade unionist and political campaigner. However, a bout of meningitis ended her train driving career as she was declared medically unfit to drive trains. Being on the then Economic League employment blacklist, her future job options were extremely limited, but she was able to find employment as a full-time officer for the trade union UNISON. She was extremely successful in representing Union members at employment tribunals, more than holding her own against professional barristers. Her proud boast was that she never 'lost' a tribunal. This gave her a taste for the law prompting her to take up legal studies as a mature student.

University education and death
Harrison became a mature student at the University of Oxford (Harris Manchester College), where she was an undergraduate studying for a degree in law. She once described the effects of this mid-life transition, explaining, "I find studying hard, f***ing hard. But it's easier than driving trains for a living. It's hard to get too stressed about exams when you've experienced things like brake failure approaching a red signal, especially when you can see another train crossing the junction in front of you. I still miss the camaraderie of my mates in ASLEF. I miss them terribly. The folk at my college are the closest I've got to that old espirit de corps and they put up with an old bag like me with great stoicism."

After graduation, Harrison had plans to work as a barrister specialising in labour law and human rights. She died in May 2011 before completing her studies. Her funeral was held in the college chapel, with a eulogy given by her tutor Louise Gullifer.

Legacy
In January 2023, a mural was unveiled at Euston station celebrating Harrison. It had been commissioned by Avanti West Coast as part of the operator's campaign for a fifth of new recruits to be women. Her sister said she hoped Harrison would continue to "inspire women to consider train driving".

References

External links
Helena Wojtczak, Railwaywomen : exploitation, betrayal and triumph in the workplace, 2005 (Hastings)
Kinsman, Francis, Millennium: Towards Tomorrow's Society, 1991 (W.H. Allen)

1960 births
2011 deaths
Trade unionists from Glasgow
British train drivers
People educated at St. Michael's Catholic Grammar School
Alumni of Harris Manchester College, Oxford
Women trade unionists
Associated Society of Locomotive Engineers and Firemen